Carlisle County is a county located in the U.S. state of Kentucky. As of the 2020 census, the population was 4,826, making it the fourth-least populous county in Kentucky. Its county seat is Bardwell. The county was founded in 1886 and named for John Griffin Carlisle, a Speaker of the United States House of Representatives from Kentucky. It remains a prohibition or dry county.

Geography
The county's western border with Missouri is formed by the Mississippi River.

Adjacent counties
 Ballard County (north)
 McCracken County (northeast)
 Graves County (east)
 Hickman County (south)
 Mississippi County, Missouri (west)

Demographics

As of the census of 2000, there were 5,351 people, 2,208 households, and 1,574 families residing in the county. The racial makeup of the county was 97.78% White, 0.95% Black or African American, 0.41% Native American, 0.07% Asian, 0.22% from other races, and 0.56% from two or more races.  0.82% of the population were Hispanic or Latino of any race.

There were 2,208 households, out of which 30.60% had children under the age of 18 living with them, 58.50% were married couples living together, 9.30% had a female householder with no husband present, and 28.70% were non-families. 26.30% of all households were made up of individuals, and 13.10% had someone living alone who was 65 years of age or older.  The average household size was 2.40 and the average family size was 2.88.

In the county, the population was spread out, with 23.40% under the age of 18, 7.80% from 18 to 24, 26.40% from 25 to 44, 24.10% from 45 to 64, and 18.30% who were 65 years of age or older.  The median age was 40 years. For every 100 females there were 95.20 males.  For every 100 females age 18 and over, there were 92.90 males.

The median income for a household in the county was $30,087, and the median income for a family was $33,433. Males had a median income of $29,523 versus $19,792 for females. The per capita income for the county was $16,276.  About 10.50% of families and 13.10% of the population were below the poverty line, including 17.40% of those under age 18 and 11.00% of those age 65 or over.

Politics

Communities

Cities
 Arlington
 Bardwell

Unincorporated communities
 Cunningham
 Geveden
 Milburn
 Yellow Dog Road

See also

 National Register of Historic Places listings in Carlisle County, Kentucky
 List of counties in Kentucky

References

 
1886 establishments in Kentucky
Kentucky counties
Kentucky counties on the Mississippi River
Populated places established in 1886